Playacar is an upscale resort area of Playa del Carmen.

Located in Playa del Carmen in the state of Quintana Roo, Mexico in the  municipality of Solidaridad, it is a gated community that has grown with Playa del Carmen, just south of its main urban area. Playacar is approximately a 40 minute drive from Cancun.

It is composed of 2 sections: the first one, Playacar Phase 1 offers by-the-sea secluded beaches and villas, very close to downtown Playa del Carmen. The second, Playacar Phase II, was built around a golf course designed by Robert von Hagge, and exposes all-inclusive resorts and private villas all around.

In popular culture
In I Love New York, the section is used as a location for filming in the season finale.

External links
 Touristinfo ″Playa del Carmen - Playacar″ 

Populated places in Quintana Roo
Solidaridad (municipality)
Seaside resorts in Mexico